Chihaya may refer to:  

Chihaya (clothing)
Chihaya Castle, a castle in Kawachi Province, Japan
Chihaya Station, a railway station in Fukuoka City, Japan
Chihaya Yard, a classification yard in Fukuoka City, Japan
Chihaya, Fukui,  a location in the Fukui Prefecture, Japan 
Siege of Chihaya, a siege that took place during the Kamakura period of Japan
Japanese cruiser Chihaya, a cruiser of the Imperial Japanese Navy

People:
, a Japanese author
, Japanese baseball player
, Japanese singer
, a fictional character from Chihayafuru
, Japanese scientist

Japanese-language surnames
Japanese feminine given names